St John the Evangelist's Church is a redundant Anglican church in the village of Cadeby, South Yorkshire, England.  It is recorded in the National Heritage List for England as a designated Grade II listed building, and is under the care of the Churches Conservation Trust. Victoria Cross recipient George Harry Wyatt is buried there.

History

The church was built in 1856 for Sir Joseph Copley and was designed by Sir George Gilbert Scott.  The church cost £6,000 (equivalent to £ in ),and was consecrated on 25 September 1860.  St John's was declared redundant on 1 March 1990, and was vested in the Trust on 26 June 1991.

Architecture

St John's is constructed in ashlar Magnesian Limestone, and has a graduated slate roof. Its plan consists of three-bay nave and a two-bay chancel, with north and south aisles and chapels constituting a single cell.  It has a gabled south porch, and is in Gothic Revival style.  On the roof between the nave and chancel is bellcote.  Along the sides are lancet windows, while the west window has two lights and the east window three lights. Inside the church the arcades are carried on circular piers with capitals carved with naturalistic foliage.  Most of the original fittings are still in the church, including an octagonal font and a wooden pulpit. The internal carvings of the church were carried out by J. Birnie Philip.

See also

List of new churches by George Gilbert Scott in Northern England
List of churches preserved by the Churches Conservation Trust in Northern England
Listed buildings in Cadeby, South Yorkshire

References

Grade II listed churches in South Yorkshire
Churches completed in 1856
19th-century Church of England church buildings
Gothic Revival church buildings in England
Gothic Revival architecture in South Yorkshire
Churches preserved by the Churches Conservation Trust
Church of England church buildings in South Yorkshire
Former Church of England church buildings